Olax scandens is a species of epiphytic plant in the family Olacaceae. Its native range is India, Indo-China and Malesia, with no subspecies listed in the Catalogue of Life.  Its name in Vietnamese is dương đầu leo or mao trật.

References

External links 

Flora of Indo-China 
Flora of Malesia 
Olacaceae